The Europe/Africa Zone is one of the three zones of the regional Davis Cup competition in 1988.

In the Europe/Africa Zone there are two different tiers, called groups, in which teams compete against each other to advance to the upper tier. The winner in the Africa Zone Group II advanced to the Europe/Africa Zone Group I in 1989.

Participating nations

Draw

  are promoted to Group I in 1989.

First round

Ghana vs. Kenya

Second round

Zimbabwe vs. Cameroon

Ivory Coast vs. Algeria

Tunisia vs. Morocco

Egypt vs. Kenya

Third round

Ivory Coast vs. Zimbabwe

Morocco vs. Egypt

Fourth round

Zimbabwe vs. Egypt

References

External links
Davis Cup official website

Davis Cup Europe/Africa Zone
Africa Zone Group II